

Annales de chimie et de physique (French for Annals of Chemistry and Physics) is a scientific journal founded in Paris, France, in 1789 under the title Annales de chimie. One of the early editors was the French chemist Antoine Lavoisier. Lavoisier, an aristocrat, was guillotined in May 1794, ostensibly for tax fraud: and the journal was not published from 1794 to 1796 while the Reign of Terror was at its height under the French Directory.

In 1815, it became the Annales de chimie et de physique, and was published under that name for the next 100 years.

In 1914, it split into two successor journals. The first one, Annales de physique, was latterly published by EDP Sciences under the same name up to 2009, when it became integrated in the European Physical Journal series as the European Physical Journal H – Historical Perspectives on Contemporary Physics. The second successor, Annales de chimie, later became Annales de chimie: Science des matériaux in 1978; from 1998 to 2004, it was published online by Elsevier, and since 2004, it has been managed online by the  publishing company. Despite the name changes, the volume numbering maintained continuity between the different titles, both for the physics journal and the chemistry journal.

Notable works
 A. Fresnel, 1818, "Mémoire sur la diffraction de la lumière" ("Memoir on the diffraction of light"), deposited 29 July 1818, "crowned" 15 March 1819, published (with appended notes) in Mémoires de l'Académie Royale des Sciences de l'Institut de France, vol.  (for 1821 & 1822, printed 1826), pp. 339–475; reprinted (with notes) in Fresnel, 1866–70, vol. 1, pp. 247–383; partly translated as "Fresnel's prize memoir on the diffraction of light", in Crew, 1900, pp. 81–144.  
 D.F.J. Arago and A. Fresnel, 1819, "Mémoire sur l'action que les rayons de lumière polarisée exercent les uns sur les autres", Annales de Chimie et de Physique, Ser.2, vol. 10, pp. 288–305, March 1819; reprinted in Fresnel, 1866–70, vol. 1, pp. 509–22; translated as "On the action of rays of polarized light upon each other", in Crew, 1900, pp. 145–55.

References

Sources and further reading
Early history (in French), sourced from: Dictionnaire des journaux (1600–1789) sous la direction de Jean SGARD. Paris, Universitas, 1991. (Notice A.-M. CHOUILLET)
The Development of Modern Chemistry, pp. 273, in the chapter 'The Diffusion of Chemical Knowledge',  Aaron John Ihde, Courier Dover Publications, 1984
In the Shadow of Lavoisier: The 'Annales de Chimie' and the Establishment of a New Science. Maurice Crosland. 1994

External links
Annales de physique (1914–present)
Annales de Chimie - Science des Matériaux (1998–2004)
Annales de Chimie - Science des Matériaux (2004–present)

Listings
 Partially complete series 1789–1913 in downloadable PDF format on Gallica.bnf.fr (select calendar/list for chosen year)
Annales de chimie Series 1 (1789–1815)
Annales de chimie et de physique Series 2–8 (1816-1913)
 Indexes
Series 1 (1789–1815), 96 issues (Table Générale Raisonnée)
Index to vols. 1-30 (1789-1798) (pub. 1801) (Archive.org)
Index to vols. 31-60 (1799-1807) (pub. 1807) (Archive.org)
Index to vols. 61-96 (1807-1815) (pub. 1821) (Archive.org)
 Series 2 (1816–1840), 75 issues (Table Générale Raisonnée)
Index to vols. 1-30 (1816-1825) (pub. 1831) (Archive.org) 
Index to vols. 31-60 (1826-1835) (pub. 1840) (Archive.org)
Index to vols. 61-75 (1836-1840) (pub. 1841) (Gallica)
 Series 3 (1841–1863), 69 issues
Index to vols. 1-30 (1841-1850) (pub.  1851) (Tables des tomes I a XXX) (HathiTrust - partner login required for full pdf)
Index to vols. 31-69 (1851-1863) (pub. 1866) (Table analytique des matières) (Archive.org)
Index to Series 4 (1864–1873), 30 issues (pub. 1874) (Tables des noms d'auteurs et Table analytique des matières) (Gallica)
 Index to Series 5 (1874-1883), 30 issues (pub. 1885) (Gallica)
 Index to Series 6 (1884–1893), 30 issues (pub. 1895) (Gallica)
 Index to Series 7 (1894–1903), 30 issues (pub. Masson et Cie, Paris, 1911)
 Index to Series 8 (1904–1913), 30 issues (pub. 1924) (Gallica)

Other collections
University of Oslo list of periodicals – includes listings for:
Annales de chimie – 1789–1800, 1914–1977
Annales de chimie et de physique – 1816–1913
Annales de chimie – science des matériaux – 1978–1998
Royal Society of Chemistry list of periodicals – includes listings for:
Annales de Chimie – Science des Matériaux  1789–1815;1914–2004, vols 1–96, [9]1–29
Annales de Chimie et de Physique 1816–1913, series [2]–[8].
National Library of Australia: entry for Annales de chimie – science des matériaux (1978–present)
National Library of Australia: entry for Annales de physique (1914–present)

Physics journals
Chemistry journals
1789 establishments in France
Publications established in 1789
French-language journals
Defunct journals
Publications disestablished in 1914